The molecular formula C19H27NO3 (molar mass: 317.42 g/mol, exact mass: 317.1991 u) may refer to:

 EA-3443
 Nateglinide
 PRE-084
 Tetrabenazine

Molecular formulas